Claravis may refer to:

 A brand name for the drug isotretinoin
 The genus of the blue ground dove